Fatou may refer to:

People 
 Aminata Fatou Diallo (born 1995), French footballer
 Cecilia Fatou-Berre (1901 – 1989), religious sister
 Fatou Baldeh (born 1983), Gambian women's rights activist
 Fatou Bensouda, Gambian lawyer and former Chief Prosecutor of the International Criminal Court
 Fatou Bintou Fall (born 1981), Senegalese athlete
 Fatou Camara (journalist), Gambian journalist
 Fatou Coulibaly (born 1987), Ivorian footballer
 Fatou Diagne (born 1996), Senegalese basketball player
 Fatou Diatta, Senegalese rapper and activist
 Fatou Dieng (athlete) (born 1983), Mauritanian sprint athlete
 Fatou Dieng (basketball) (born 1983), Senegalese basketball player
 Fatou Diome, French-Senegalese writer
 Fatou Dioup (born 1994), Mauritanian footballer
 Fatou Jagne, Gambian jurist
 Fatou Jallow, Gambian model
 Fatou Jaw-Manneh, Gambian journalist
 Fatou Kandé Senghor (born 1971), Senegalese film director
 Fatou Kanteh (born 1997), Gambian footballer
 Fatou Keïta (born 1965), Ivorian writer
 Fatou Khan (c. 1880–c. 1940), Gambian administrator
 Fatou Kiné Camara (born 1964), Senegalese lawyer
 Fatou Mass Jobe-Njie, Gambian politician
 Fatou N'Diaye (basketball) (born 1962), French - Senegalese basketball player
 Fatou N'Diaye, Senegalese actress
 Fatou Ndaga Dieng (born 1983), Mauritanian athlete
 Fatou Ndiaye Sow, Senegalese writer
 Fatou Niang Siga (born 1932), Senegalese author
 Fatou Samba, member of the Korean girl group Blackswan
 Fatou Sanyang Kinteh, Gambian politician
 Fatou Seidi Ghali, Tuareg musician from Niger
 Fatou Sene (born 1989), Senegalese footballer
 Fatou Sow (sociologist) (born 1941), Senegalese sociologist
 Fatou Tiyana (born 1987), Gambian athlete
 Mame Fatou Faye (born 1986), Senegalese athlete
 Ndèye Fatou Kane, (born 1986 in Dakar), Senegalese writer
 Ndèye Fatou Soumah (born 1986), Senegalese athlete
 Pierre Fatou, French mathematician

Other 
 Fatou (album), an album by Malian musician Fatoumata Diawara
 Fatou (gorilla), a gorilla in the Berlin Zoo
 Fatou station, subway station in Beijing
 Tropical Depression Fatou (1979)
 20394 Fatou, an asteroid

See also 
 Fatu (disambiguation)
 Fatoumata